Blue Ridge Township is a township in Piatt County, Illinois, USA.  As of the 2010 census, its population was 1,480 and it contained 641 housing units.

Geography

Cities and towns
 Mansfield

Extinct towns
 Blue Ridge
 Harris

Adjacent townships
 Bellflower Township, McLean County (north)
 Mahomet Township, Champaign County (east)
 Newcomb Township, Champaign County (east)
 Sangamon Township (south)
 Goose Creek Township (southwest)
 Santa Anna Township, DeWitt County (west)
 West Township, McLean County (northwest)

Cemeteries
The township contains three cemeteries: Blue Ridge, Dunkard and Mansfield.

Major highways
  Interstate 74
  U.S. Route 150

Airports and landing strips
 Ashworth Landing Strip
 Marvin D Bradd Airport
 Niklaus RLA Airport
 Robert Armstead Ashworth Airport
 Van Gorder Airport
 Weidner Landing Field

Demographics

References
 U.S. Board on Geographic Names (GNIS)
 United States Census Bureau cartographic boundary files

External links
 US-Counties.com
 City-Data.com
 Illinois State Archives

Townships in Piatt County, Illinois
1859 establishments in Illinois
Populated places established in 1859
Townships in Illinois